DiResta or di Resta is a surname. Notable people with the surname include:

Jimmy DiResta (born 1967), American designer, artist, and video producer
John DiResta, American comedian and actor
Paul di Resta (born 1986), British racing driver